The 2014 Wilson Security Sandown 500 was a motor race meeting for the Australian sedan-based V8 Supercars. It was the tenth event of the 2014 International V8 Supercars Championship. It was held on the weekend of 12-14 September at the Sandown Raceway, near Melbourne, Victoria.

Results

Qualifying

Qualifying Race 1

Qualifying Race 2

Race

References 

Sandown
Motorsport at Sandown
Pre-Bathurst 500